Carl Edvard Persson (17 January 1888, in Sankt Pauli parish, Malmö, Scania – 19 September 1957, in Helsingborg, Scania) was a celebrated Swedish actor, director and singer. During his time, he was well-known in the entire country, but through many of his films and songs, he is often associated with his home province, Scania (Swedish and Danish: Skåne). He was also a popular entertainer in Denmark<ref>Swedish National Archive  , "I Danmark var P:s popularitet inte mindre än i Sverige." or "In Denmark was his popularity no less than in Sweden".</ref> and after an American 1947 inviting, he made a 100 day tour in the US "Swedish communities" and made 36 concerts in New York City and in 35 other American cities.

Biography and career

He got his first role in the 1923 silent film Studenterna på Tröstehult. Overall, Persson made 45 feature films, among those were South of the Highway and Kalle på Spången. He was one of the most popular film actors of his time, often playing the same kind of character - the jovial and good-natured man from Scania.

As a singer he released numerous records. Among his more famous songs were Kalle på Spången, Jag har bott vid en landsväg, Jag är en liten gåsapåg från Skåne and Vi klarar oss nog ändå.

Partial filmography

 Studenterna på Tröstehult (1924) - Tobias Bruce, informator
 Den gamla herrgården (1925) - Tutor
 Miljonär för en dag (1926) - Kalle 'Blixten' Svensson
 Kvick som Blixten (1927) - Kalle 'Blixten' Svensson
 Vad kvinnan vill (1927) - Kalle Pettersson
 På kryss med Blixten (1927) - Kalle 'Blixten' Svensson
 Hattmakarens bal (1928) - Cederström
 The Southsiders (1932) - 'Lasse' Larsson
 Sten Stensson Stéen från Eslöv på nya äventyr (1932) - Karlsson
 Två hjärtan och en skuta (1932) - Johansson
 Augusta's Little Misstep (1933) - Smulle Månsson
 The Dangerous Game (1933) - Vredberg
 Saturday Nights (1933) - Nappe Johansson
 Secret Svensson (1933) - August Olsson
 Flickorna från Gamla sta'n (1934) - Edvard Larsson
 The Women Around Larsson (1934) - Lasse Larsson
 Close Relations (1935) - Lasse Larsson
 Larsson i andra giftet (1935) - Lasse Larsson, baker
 Our Boy (1936) - Lars Blomquist
 South of the Highway (1936) - Edward Månsson
 Än leva de gamla gudar (1937) - Napoleon Pettersson
 Baldwin's Wedding (1938) - Baldevin
 Skanör-Falsterbo (1939) - Henrik Karlsson
 Kalle's Inn (1939) - Kalle Jeppsson
 Bashful Anton (1940) - Karl Anton Malm
 A Sailor on Horseback (1940) - Lasse Borg
 Sunny Sunberg (1941) - Gunnar Solberg
 Snapphanar (1941) - Grimme Jens
 Sun Over Klara (1942) - Ararat
 Stinsen på Lyckås (1942) - Carl Malm
 Life in the Country (1943) - Zakarias Bräsig
 Turn of the Century (1944) - Squire Munthe
 The Happy Tailor (1945) - Sören Sörenson
 The Bells of the Old Town (1946) - Carl Magnus Berg
 Jens Mansson in America (1947) - Jens Månsson
 Unconquered (1947) - Indian (uncredited)
 Each Heart Has Its Own Story (1948) - Baron Henric Löwencrona af Löwstaborg
 Sven Tusan (1949) - Sven 'Tusan' Jönsson
 Number 17 (1949) - Calle Svensson
 Pimpernel Svensson (1950) - Anders 'Pimpernel' Svensson
 Count Svensson (1951) - Anders Svensson
 The Girl from Backafall (1953) - Silla-Sven
 A Night at Glimmingehus (1954) - Nils Jeppsen
 Blue Sky (1955) - Fridolf Rundquist
 When the Mills are Running'' (1956) - Blomster-Pelle Pettersson (final film role)

References

External links

1888 births
1957 deaths
Swedish male film actors
Swedish male silent film actors
20th-century Swedish male actors
20th-century Swedish male singers
Actors from Malmö
Singers from Malmö